David Clemens may refer to:
 David Clemens (soccer), American soccer player
 David Clemens (politician), member of the North Dakota Senate

See also
 David Clements (disambiguation)